Arranz is a surname. Notable people with the surname include:

Asier Arranz (born 1987), Spanish footballer
Dolores Herrera Arranz (born 1935), Spanish actress
Eduardo Arranz-Bravo (born 1941),  Spanish painter
Joana Arranz (born 1988), Spanish footballer
José Arranz (1930–2018), Spanish priest
Mario Arranz (born 1978), Spanish rower
Melecio Arranz (1888–1966), Filipino politician
Paloma Arranz (born 1969), Spanish handball player

See also 
Arranz-Bravo Foundation, Art museum and gallery in L’Hospitalet de Llobregat, Catalonia